East Canyon State Park is a state park of Utah, USA, featuring a  reservoir.  The park is located northeast of Salt Lake City in Morgan County, Utah.

Park facilities 
Park facilities are open year-round, and include a concrete boat launching ramp, paved parking, restrooms, showers, a fish cleaning station, a 33 unit RV campground with full and partial hookups, two covered group-use pavilions, boat rental, and a snack bar.

East Canyon Dam 
The reservoir is fed by East Canyon Creek and is part of the Weber Basin Project. It was constructed between 1964 and 1966.

References

External links
 East Canyon State Park

Protected areas established in 1962
Protected areas of Morgan County, Utah
State parks of Utah